Utakata is the 2nd mini album by Chara (or 15th studio album), which was released on November 2, 2011. Utakata was released as a regular CD Only version (DDCZ-1781).

This album was Chara's third studio album that wasn't preceded by any singles or promotional tracks, the first being her 2005 effort "something blue" and the second her 2011 "Dark Candy". The style of "Utakata" consists mainly of mellow ballads with influences from trip hop, rock and ambient.

Track listing

Charts

References 

Chara (singer) EPs
2011 albums